Cornelis Vollenhoven  (3 February 1778, Amsterdam – 14 November 1849, The Hague) was a Dutch politician.

References

1778 births
1849 deaths
Ministers of the Interior of the Netherlands
Lawyers from Amsterdam
Politicians from Amsterdam
Leiden University alumni